Inkankezi River is a river in Insiza District, in Zimbabwe.

It is the principal left-bank tributary of the Insiza River. It rises northeast of Filabusi, with its mouth at Silalabuhwa Dam.

References 

Insiza River